Derbyshire County Cricket Club in 1923 was the cricket season when the English club Derbyshire had been playing for fifty-two years. It was their twenty-fifth season in the County Championship and they won four matches to finish tenth.

1923 season

Derbyshire played twenty two games in the County Championship and one against the touring West Indies. They won four games altogether and finished tenth in the Championship table.

Guy Jackson was in his second year as captain. Wilfred Hill-Wood was top scorer and Billy Bestwick took most wickets.

New players in the season were James Cresswell who played 21 matches over four seasons, and 
Richard Pratt who played five matches in two seasons.

Matches

{| class="wikitable" style="width:100%;"
|-
! style="background:#efefef;" colspan="6"| List of  matches
|- style="background:#efefef;"
!No.
!Date
!V
!Result 
!Margin
!Notes
 |- 
|1
|12 May 1923
 | Nottinghamshire <small>   Trent Bridge, Nottingham 
| style="background:#fc0;"|Drawn
|
| Gunn 220; Richmond 5-101; W Bestwick  5-53   
|- 
|2
|19 May 1923
| Warwickshire Edgbaston, Birmingham 
| style="background:#0f0;"|Won
| 4 wickets
| J Horsley 7-48; Partridge 7-66; Howell 5-68   
|- 
|3
|23 May 1923
|  WorcestershireTipton Road, Dudley 
| style="background:#fc0;"|Drawn
|
|    
|- 
|4
|26 May 1923
| Essex    Queen's Park, Chesterfield 
| style="background:#fc0;"|Drawn
|
| A Morton 7-48   
|- 
|5
|30 May 1923
| Yorkshire  County Ground, Derby 
| style="background:#f00;"|Lost
| Innings and 126 runs
|  Kilner 5-32  
|- 
|6
|06 Jun 1923
|  Gloucestershire <small>  Fry's Ground, Bristol 
| style="background:#f00;"|Lost
| Innings and 72 runs
| Mills 6-72   
|- 
|7
|09 Jun 1923
| Glamorgan   Cardiff Arms Park 
| style="background:#fc0;"|Drawn
|
|  GR Jackson 102; W Bestwick  7-39 and 5-55  
|- 
|8
|13 Jun 1923
| SomersetRecreation Ground, Bath 
| style="background:#fc0;"|Drawn
|
| Lyon 134; WWH Hill-Wood 107; J Bowden 114; Bridges 5-117   
|- 
|9
|16 Jun 1923
| Leicestershire  Bath Grounds, Ashby-de-la-Zouch 
| style="background:#0f0;"|Won
| 62 runs
|  Geary 6-70; W Bestwick  7-61 and 6-37  
|- 
|10
|20 Jun 1923
| West Indies  Park Road Ground, Buxton 
| style="background:#fc0;"|Drawn
|
| SWA Cadman 5-41   
|- 
|11
|23 Jun 1923
| Lancashire  County Ground, Derby 
| style="background:#fc0;"|Drawn
|
| W Bestwick  6-60   
|- 
|12
|30 Jun 1923
| Northamptonshire    Queen's Park, Chesterfield 
| style="background:#0f0;"|Won
 | Innings and 211 runs
|  W Carter 100*; W Bestwick  5-45; J Horsley 6-29  
|- 
|13
|04 Jul 1923
| Essex   County Ground, Leyton 
| style="background:#fc0;"|Drawn
|
|  Douglas 110; A Morton 100  
|- 
|14
|07 Jul 1923
|  Gloucestershire <small> The Town Ground, Burton-on-Trent 
| style="background:#f00;"|Lost
| 8 wickets
|  Parker 7-37 and 5-76; Dennett 5-93  
|- 
|15
|14 Jul 1923
| Somerset Queen's Park, Chesterfield 
| style="background:#f00;"|Lost
| 61 runs
| J Horsley 5-40 and 5-45; White 5-35   
|- 
|16
|21 Jul 1923
| Northamptonshire   County Ground, Northampton 
| style="background:#f00;"|Lost
| 1 wicket
| W Bestwick  5-61   
|- 
|17
| 25 Jul 1923
| Glamorgan  <small>Queen's Park, Chesterfield 
| style="background:#0f0;"|Won
| 5 wickets
| J Horsley 5-58   
|- 
|18
|28 Jul 1923
|  Worcestershire County Ground, Derby 
| style="background:#fc0;"|Drawn
 |
|    
|- 
|19
|04 Aug 1923
| Warwickshire  County Ground, Derby 
| style="background:#fc0;"|Drawn
|
|  GR Jackson 109; WWH Hill-Wood 5-62  
|- 
|20
|11 Aug 1923
| Yorkshire<small>  Park Avenue Cricket Ground, Bradford 
| style="background:#f00;"|Lost
| 8 wickets
|  Rhodes 7-60; J Horsley 5-69  
|- 
|21
|18 Aug 1923
| Nottinghamshire     Queen's Park, Chesterfield 
| style="background:#fc0;"|Drawn
|
| Staples 5-101   
|- 
|22
|22 Aug 1923
| Leicestershire<small> County Ground, Derby 
| style="background:#fc0;"|Drawn
|
|  J Horsley 6-49  
|- 
|23
|25 Aug 1923
 | Lancashire <small> Old Trafford, Manchester 
| style="background:#f00;"|Lost
| Innings and 32 runs
| Parkin 6-68 and 5-12; A Morton 6-45; Ellis 5-21   
|-

Statistics

County Championship batting averages

County Championship bowling averages

Wicket Keeper

H Elliott - Catches  25, Stumping 7

See also
Derbyshire County Cricket Club seasons
1923 English cricket season

References

1923 in English cricket
Derbyshire County Cricket Club seasons
English cricket seasons in the 20th century